Catocala formosana is a moth in the family Erebidae first described by Okano in 1958. It is found in Taiwan.

References

formosana
Moths described in 1958
Moths of Taiwan